Mesopeplum convexum is a species of scallop, marine bivalve molluscs in the family Pectinidae.

References
 Powell A. W. B., New Zealand Mollusca, William Collins Publishers Ltd, Auckland, New Zealand, (1979), 

Pectinidae
Bivalves of Australia
Bivalves of New Zealand
Bivalves described in 1835